

References

List
Kahramanmaraş